John Nassau Greene (8 March 1890 – 11 February 1973) was an Irish politician. A farmer from Athy, he was elected to Kildare County Council in the 1925 local elections, standing for the Farmers' Party in the Athy local electoral area. He was an independent member of Seanad Éireann from April to August 1938. He was elected to the 2nd Seanad in April 1938 to the Agricultural Panel. He did not contest the August 1938 Seanad election.

Greene served as a medical officer with the RAF during World War II.

In January 1955 Greene became the first president of the National Farmers' Association, later known as the Irish Farmers' Association.

References

1890 births
1973 deaths
Farmers' Party (Ireland) politicians
Independent members of Seanad Éireann
Irish agrarianists
Irish farmers
Local councillors in County Kildare
Members of the 2nd Seanad
Non-British Royal Air Force personnel of World War II
People from Athy
People from County Kildare